Mbeya Airport  is an airport located in Mbeya Region, Tanzania. The airport is small and serves the city of Mbeya. It is within the southern section of the city.

The Mbeya non-directional beacon (Ident: MB) is located on the field.

Airlines and destinations

See also

 List of airports in Tanzania
 Transport in Tanzania

References

External links
Tanzania Airports Authority
(MBI) Mbeya Airport overview on FlightStats.org
OpenStreetMap - Mbeya
OurAirports - Mbeya

Airports in Tanzania
Buildings and structures in the Mbeya Region